Goodier is a surname. Notable persons with that surname include:

David Goodier (born 1954), English bass guitarist
James N. Goodier, (1905–1969), English American professor of applied mechanics
Lewis E. Goodier, Jr. (1885–1961), American aviator
Mark Goodier (born 1961), British radio disc jockey
Ted Goodier (1902–1967), English professional footballer and football manager

See also
Goodere, a surname
Goodyear, a surname
Goodyer, a surname